Kazuki Yamada (山田 和樹; born 26 January 1979) is a Japanese conductor.
{{external media|align=cleft|width=200px|video1=You may see Kazuki Yamada conducting the Monte-Carlo Philharmonic Orchestra in 2020 with Nelson Freire in Ludwig van Beethoven's:  Piano Concerto No. 4 in G major, Op. 58  Symphony No. 8 in F Major, Op. 93 [https://archive.org/details/gala-concert-from-monaco  'Here on archive.org]}}

Biography
Yamada was born in Hadano, Kanagawa Prefecture. He studied music, with a focus on percussion, at the Tokyo University of the Arts, where his conducting teachers included Ken-Ichiro Kobayashi and Yoko Matsuo.  Whilst at the university, he and fellow students founded an orchestra, the TOMATO Philharmonic Orchestra, with Yamada as its music director.  The orchestra renamed itself the Yokohama Sinfonietta in 2005, and incorporated professionally in 2011.  Yamada was the first prize winner in the 51st Besançon International Conducting Competition in 2009.  Other honours include the Akeo Watanabe Music Foundation Music Award and the Hideo Saito Memorial Fund Award, both dating from 2012.  He holds the post of 'permanent conductor' of the Japan Philharmonic, and is contracted with the orchestra through August 2017.  In September 2017, the Yomiuri Nippon Symphony Orchestra announced the appointment of Yamada as its next principal guest conductor, effective April 2018, with an initial contract of three years.

In Europe, Yamada first guest-conducted the Orchestre de la Suisse Romande (OSR) in 2010.  He became the OSR's principal guest conductor in 2012, with an initial contract of 3 years, after attempts to secure him as the orchestra's next principal conductor did not come to fruition.  In June 2014, his contract as principal guest conductor of the OSR was extended through 31 August 2017.  Yamada has conducted several commercial recordings with the OSR for the Pentatone label.

Yamada first guest-conducted the Monte-Carlo Philharmonic Orchestra (OPMC) in 2011. In the fall of 2013, he became the orchestra's principal guest conductor. In April 2015, the OPMC announced the appointment of Yamada as its next principal conductor and artistic director, effective September 2016, with an initial contract of three years.  In September 2020, the OPMC announced the most recent contract extension for Yamada, through the 2023-2024 season.

Yamada first guest-conducted the City of Birmingham Symphony Orchestra (CBSO) in 2012.  In May 2018, the CBSO announced the appointment of Yamada as its next principal guest conductor, effective with the 2018–2019 season. In January 2021, the CBSO announced the extension of Yamada's contract as principal guest conductor with CBSO until 2023.  In September 2021, the CBSO announced the appointment of Yamada as its next chief conductor and artistic advisor, effective 1 April 2023, with an initial contract of 4.5 years.

Yamada, his wife, and their family reside in Berlin.

Selected discography
 Georges Bizet - L'Arlésienne Suites; Gabriel Fauré - Masques et Bergamasques; Charles Gounod - Faust Ballet Music.  Orchestre de la Suisse Romande. Pentatone PTC 5186358 (2013)
 Richard Strauss, Franz Liszt, Erich Wolfgang Korngold, Ferruccio Busoni, Franz Schreker - Orchestral works.  Orchestre de la Suisse Romande. Pentatone PTC 5186518 (2014)
 Russian Dances. Pyotr Ilyich Tchaikovsky - Suite from Swan Lake; Alexander Glazunov - 2 Concert Waltzes; Dmitri Shostakovich - The Golden Age; Igor Stravinsky - Circus Polka.  Orchestre de la Suisse Romande. Pentatone PTC 5186557 (2016)
 Albert Roussel - Bacchus & Ariane; Claude Debussy - Six Épigraphes Antiques; Francis Poulenc - Les Biches.  Orchestre de la Suisse Romande. Pentatone PTC 5186558 (2016)
 Manuel de Falla - Noches en los Jardines de España / El sombrero de tres picos''. Mari Kodama, Sophie Harmsen, Orchestre de la Suisse Romande. Pentatone PTC 5186598 (2017)
 Maurice Ravel and George Gershwin - Piano Concertos. Denis Kozhukhin , Orchestre de la Suisse Romande. PENTATONE PTC 5186620 (2018).

References

External links
 Official Kazuki Yamada homepage, biography
 Yokohama Sinfonietta English-language page on Yamada
 Konzertdirektion Schmid agency biography of Kazuki Yamada

1979 births
21st-century conductors (music)
Japanese conductors (music)
Japanese male conductors (music)
Living people
People from Hadano, Kanagawa